Will is the third studio album from American singer-songwriter Julianna Barwick. It was released in May 2016, under Dead Oceans Records.

Accolades

Track listing

References

2016 albums
Julianna Barwick albums
Dead Oceans albums